= Kardai =

- village
- Location within Madhya Pradesh Location within India
- Coordinates: 23.378785°N 77.335314°E
- Country: India
- State: Madhya Pradesh
- District: Bhopal
- Tehsil: Huzur
- Elevation: 504 m (1,654 ft)

Population (2011)
  - Total: 391
- Time zone: UTC+5:30 (IST)
- ISO 3166 code: MP-IN
- 2011 census code: 482377

Kardai is a village in the Bhopal district of Madhya Pradesh, India. It is located in the Huzur tehsil and the Phanda block.

== Demographics ==
According to the 2011 census of India, Kardai has 81 households. The effective literacy rate (i.e. the literacy rate of population excluding children aged 6 and below) is 61.42%.

Demographics (2011 Census)
	Total	Male	Female
Population	391	214	177
Children aged below 6 years	54	35	19
Scheduled caste	193	102	91
Scheduled tribe	0	0	0
Literates	207	132	75
Workers (all)	203	116	87
Main workers (total)	137	79	58
Main workers: Cultivators	33	25	8
Main workers: Agricultural labourers	102	54	48
Main workers: Household industry workers	2	0	2
Main workers: Other	0	0	0
Marginal workers (total)	66	37	29
Marginal workers: Cultivators	10	7	3
Marginal workers: Agricultural labourers	52	30	22
Marginal workers: Household industry workers	2	0	2
Marginal workers: Others	2	0	2
Non-workers	188	98	90
